The fifth series of the children's television series Hi-5 aired between 25 August 2003 and 24 October 2003 on the Nine Network in Australia. The series was produced by Kids Like Us for Nine with Helena Harris as executive producer. This series featured the 200th episode.

Cast

Presenters
 Kellie Crawford – Word Play
 Kathleen de Leon Jones – Puzzles and Patterns
 Nathan Foley – Shapes in Space
 Tim Harding – Making Music
 Charli Robinson  – Body Move

Episodes

Home video releases

Awards and nominations

References

External links
 Hi-5 Website

2003 Australian television seasons